The 2007–08 Cincinnati Bearcats men's basketball team represented the University of Cincinnati during the 2007–08 NCAA Division I men's basketball season. The team played its home games in Cincinnati, Ohio at the Fifth Third Arena, which has a capacity of 13,176. They are members of the Big East Conference. The Bearcats finished the season 13–19, 8–10 in Big East play and were defeated in the first round of the 2008 Big East men's basketball tournament by the 7th seed Pittsburgh.

The Bearcats would lose to Bradley in the first round of the 2008 College Basketball Invitational.

Offseason

Departing players

Recruiting class of 2007

Recruiting class of 2008

Roster

Depth chart

Schedule and results

|-
!colspan=12 style=|Exhibition
|-

|-
!colspan=12 style=|Regular Season 
|-

|-
!colspan=12 style=|Big East Regular Season
|-

|-
!colspan=12 style=|Big East tournament 
|-

|-
!colspan=12 style=|College Basketball Invitational

References

Cincinnati Bearcats men's basketball seasons
Cincinnati
Cincin
Cincin